Abashkin (masculine) or Abashkina (feminine) is a Russian last name, a variant of Abashin or Abashev. It is shared by the following people:
Vladimir Abashkin, husband of Yekaterina Guseva, Russian actress and singer
Alexey Abashkin and Anna Abashkina, their children
Vladimir Abashkin, Russian ice hockey player; 2012 KHL Junior Draft pick from HC Donbass

References

Sources
Ю. А. Федосюк (Yu. A. Fedosyuk). "Русские фамилии: популярный этимологический словарь" (Russian Last Names: a Popular Etymological Dictionary). Москва, 2006. 
И. М. Ганжина (I. M. Ganzhina). "Словарь современных русских фамилий" (Dictionary of Modern Russian Last Names). Москва, 2001. 

Russian-language surnames
